Gârla Mare is a commune located in Mehedinți County, Oltenia, Romania. It is composed of a single village, Gârla Mare. It also included Vrata village until 2004, when it was split off to form Vrata Commune.

Geography
 Climate: Located in the south-west of Romania, it features a temperate-continental climate with Mediterranean influences.
 Relief: Specific to the Dolj and Mehedinți County, the commune's relief consists mainly of plains.

Economy
During the communist era, this commune was an important cultural and economic centre. It had a direct connection to the Danube trade routes through its port. Efficient use of the relief and local resources allowed for the development of farms and crops that would then be redistributed among neighbouring towns. After the fall of communism, a great deal of resources have been lost as a consequence of poor maintenance and depreciation.

References

Communes in Mehedinți County
Localities in Oltenia